Carex cherokeensis, commonly called Cherokee sedge, is a species of flowering plant in the sedge family (Cyperaceae). It is native to the United States where it is found in the Southeast. Its natural habitat is in high-nutrient, often calcareous soil, in bottomland forests, mesic forests, and wet meadows.

Carex cherokeensis is a rhizomatous perennial graminoid. It has drooping spikes which are 8–9 mm thick. Its perigynium beaks are papery and fragile. It produces fruits in late spring and early summer.

References

cherokeensis